A by-election for the Australian House of Representatives seat of Denison was held on 15 February 1964. This was triggered by the death of Liberal MP and former Defence Minister Athol Townley.

The by-election was won by Liberal candidate Adrian Gibson.

Results

References

1964 elections in Australia
Tasmanian federal by-elections
1960s in Tasmania
February 1964 events in Australia